The Gouwe is a channelized river in South Holland, the Netherlands. It runs in a north–south direction from the Oude Rijn to the Hollandse IJssel.

From Alphen aan den Rijn, where the Gouwe begins at the Gouw Locks, it flows through Boskoop and Waddinxveen to Gouda. Here it splits into the old stream through the city and into the Gouwe Canal on the city's west side.

The Gouwe was historically part of the primary (and prescribed) shipping route in Holland, connecting Dordrecht with Haarlem and later on Amsterdam. These cities, together with the Counts of Holland who collected toll at Gouda and Spaarndam, maintained this arrangement to the dissatisfaction of the cities Delft and Leiden which were bypassed by this route.

Today the Gouwe is still an important shipping route. At the Oude Rijn, river travel can be continued north over the Aar Canal. It also functions as the main water outlet for the Rijnland region.

Three striking vertical lift bridges cross the Gouwe at Alphen aan den Rijn, Boskoop, and Waddinxveen.

Rivers of South Holland
Rivers of the Netherlands